Icebreaker Glacier is a large valley glacier  northeast of Mount Monteagle that flows southeast from the Mountaineer Range to Lady Newnes Bay, Victoria Land, Antarctica. Below Hermes Point its flow coalesces with that of Fitzgerald Glacier. The glacier was named by the New Zealand Geological Survey Antarctic Expedition, 1958–59, as a tribute to the work of the complements of U.S. Navy, and U.S. Coast Guard icebreakers in Antarctic exploration, in supporting scientists and in aiding other ships.

See also
 List of glaciers in the Antarctic
 Glaciology

References

Glaciers of Borchgrevink Coast